The 1988 Coca-Cola 600, the 29th running of the event, was a NASCAR Winston Cup Series race held on May 29, 1988, at Charlotte Motor Speedway in Charlotte, North Carolina. Contested over 400 laps on the 1.5 mile (2.4 km) speedway, it was the 10th race of the 1988 NASCAR Winston Cup Series season. Darrell Waltrip of Hendrick Motorsports won the race.

Background
Charlotte Motor Speedway is a motorsports complex located in Concord, North Carolina, United States 13 miles from Charlotte, North Carolina. The complex features a 1.5 miles (2.4 km) quad oval track that hosts NASCAR racing including the prestigious Coca-Cola 600 on Memorial Day weekend and NASCAR All-Star Race, as well as the Oakwood Homes 500. The speedway was built in 1959 by Bruton Smith and is considered the home track for NASCAR with many race teams located in the Charlotte area. The track is owned and operated by Speedway Motorsports Inc. (SMI).

During the previous week's All-Star Race IV, during the midst of a major tire war between Goodyear and Hoosier, two major incidents during the event were caused by Goodyear-related failures, one on Dale Earnhardt’s Chevrolet after finishing the first segment, which was repairable as the cars were slowing down, and one on Lap 23 of the second segment, which injured Ricky Rudd after his Buick had a tire failure and crashed, forcing him to a relief driver.

Goodyear withdrew their tires after practice when it was discovered that their compound had major issues following both the previous week’s race and the first practice, owing to concerns they may not last for the different conditions of the 600 compared to the previous week’s 202 mile All Star event. Only long-time loyalist Dave Marcis stayed with the brand, while the remaining teams switched to Hoosiers over safety concerns. Goodyear offered Daytona-spec tires for those who wanted them. But the situation worsened. Three drivers - Neil Bonnett, Harry Gant, and Rick Wilson - all were hospitalized with injuries following tire failures during the 600 on Hoosiers. Marcis had more durable but slower Goodyear tires and did not have failures during the race.

Top 10 results

Ricky Rudd was relieved during the race by Mike Alexander (Rudd had suffered injuries from a crash at The Winston).
Rick Wilson led 107 laps before crashing due to tire failure.

Race statistics
 Time of race: 4:49:15
 Average Speed: 
 Pole Speed: 
 Cautions: 13 for 89 laps
 Margin of Victory: 0.24 sec
 Lead changes: 43

References

Coca-Cola 600
Coca-Cola 600
NASCAR races at Charlotte Motor Speedway